Sax or SAX may refer to:

 Saxophone (or sax), a family of woodwind instruments

People
 Oett M. Mallard (1915–1986), also known as Sax Mallard, Chicago-based jazz saxophonist and bandleader
 Lincoln Thompson (1949–1999), Jamaican reggae singer, musician and songwriter also known as Sax
 Sax (surname)
 Sax Rohmer, pen name of Arthur Henry Sarsfield Ward (1883–1959), English novelist best known for creating the villain Fu Manchu

Places
 3534 Sax, an asteroid
 Sax, a village in the Sennwald municipality in Switzerland
 Sax, Alicante, a municipality in Spain
 Sax, Minnesota, United States, an unincorporated community
 Shanxi, a province of China (Guobiao abbreviation SAX)

Other
 Sax (cigarette), an Italian brand
 "Sax" (song), a 2015 song English recording artist Fleur East
 Seax, also spelled sax, an ancient Germanic, single-edged knife
 Simple API for XML, an event-driven parsing model for XML
 Baron of Sax, later Sax-Hohensax, a Swiss title; see Hohensax Castle
 ISO 639 code for the Saa language, spoken in Vanuatu
 SA-X, an enemy in the video game Metroid Fusion
 SAX, the Bratislava Stock Exchange stock index

See also
 
 
 Doctor Sax, a novel by Jack Kerouac
 Sachs, a surname
 Sachse, Texas
 Sacks (surname)
 Saks (disambiguation)
 Saxe (disambiguation)
 Small-angle X-ray scattering (SAXS)
 Zaks (disambiguation)
 Zax (disambiguation)